The Revenge of the Pharaohs (German: Die Rache der Pharaonen) is a 1925 Austrian silent adventure film directed by Hans Theyer and starring Gustav Diessl and Suzy Vernon.

The film's sets were designed by the art director Hans Rouc.

Cast
Henry Roberts as Lord Spencer 
Maria Palma as Glady - his daughter
Benno Smytt as Georg Harrison 
Gustav Diessl as Hussein - Kemal 
Suzy Vernon as Leila

References

External links

1925 adventure films
Austrian silent feature films
Austrian adventure films
Films directed by Hans Theyer
Films set in Egypt
Austrian black-and-white films
Silent adventure films